was a private junior college in Otaru, Hokkaidō, Japan. It was established in 1967 for women, became coeducational in 1999, and closed in 2008.

See also
 List of junior colleges in Japan

External links
  

Japanese junior colleges
Universities and colleges in Hokkaido
Educational institutions established in 1967
Educational institutions disestablished in 2008